This is a list of defunct airlines of the Philippines.

See also
 List of airlines of the Philippines
 List of airports in the Philippines

References

Philippines
Airlines
Airlines, defunct